Testudinellidae is a family of rotifers belonging to the order Flosculariaceae.

Genera:
 Anchitestudinella Berzins, 1973
 Pompholyx Gosse, 1851
 Testudinella Bory de St.Vincent, 1826

References

Flosculariaceae
Rotifer families